The 2023 season is Geylang International's 28th consecutive season in the top flight of Singapore football and in the Singapore Premier League. Along with the Singapore Premier League, the club will also compete in the Singapore Cup.

Squad

Singapore Premier League

U21

Women

Coaching staff

First Team

U21 and Women Team

Transfers

In

Pre-season

Loan In 

Mid-season

Loan Return 

Pre-season

Out

Pre-season 

Mid-season

Loan Out 

Pre-season 

Note: Wayne Chew, Harith Kanadi, Elijah Lim and Zikos Vasileios Chua subsequently was snapped by Young Lions on loan for the season.

Extension / Retained

Rumored 

Pre-season

Friendlies

Pre-season

First Team

2023 Malaysia Tour (31 January - 12 February)

U21

Team statistics

Appearances and goals

Competitions

Overview

Singapore Premier League

Singapore Cup

Group

Competition (Women's Premier League)

Women's Premier League

League table

Competition (U21)

Stage 1
All 8 teams will be each other in a round robin format before breaking into 2 groups for another 3 matches. A total of 10 matches will be played thru the season.

 League table

Stage 2

 League table

Competition (U17)

U17 League

League table

See also 
 2007 Geylang United FC season
 2008 Geylang United FC season
 2009 Geylang United FC season
 2010 Geylang United FC season
 2011 Geylang United FC season
 2012 Geylang International FC season
 2013 Geylang International FC season
 2014 Geylang International FC season
 2015 Geylang International FC season
 2016 Geylang International FC season
 2017 Geylang International FC season
 2018 Geylang International FC season
 2019 Geylang International FC season
 2020 Geylang International FC season
 2021 Geylang International FC season
 2022 Geylang International FC season

Notes

References 

Geylang International FC
Geylang International FC seasons
2023
1